Kumudu Priyanka Dissanayake Mudiyanselage (born 26 March 1988) is a Sri Lankan Paralympic track and field athlete who is also a current world record holder in women's 200m T45 category. She made her maiden Paralympic appearance representing Sri Lanka at the 2020 Summer Paralympics.

Biography 
She lost both her hands and vision in one of her eyes at the age of 16 due to a hand grenade explosion. She is also current employed at MAS Holdings.

Career 
She made her debut in para-athletics during the 2006 Para Athletics National Meet. On 17 December 2010, she set the IPC world record in the women's 200m T45 category with a timing of 28.58 seconds.

She represented Sri Lanka at the 2018 Asian Para Games and claimed a bronze medal in the women's long jump event where he compatriot Amara Indumathi claimed gold medal. Kumudu initially ended up at fourth position in women's long jump final at the 2018 Asian Para Games but she was upgraded to bronze medal position following a doping violation by an Uzbekistani athlete in the same event. She claimed bronze medal in women's long jump event at the 2021 World Para Athletics Grand Prix which was held in Dubai.

She received bipartite invitation from International Paralympic Committee to participate at the Tokyo Paralympics. She was the only female athlete to have represented Sri Lanka at the 2020 Tokyo Paralympics and she was also the only civilian to have qualified to compete for Sri Lanka at the Tokyo Paralympics whereas rest of the athletes were attached to Sri Lankan Army. She became only the second female competitor to represent Sri Lanka at the Paralympics after Amara Indumathi.

She competed in both the women's long jump and women's 100m T47 events at the 2020 Summer Paralympics.

References 

1988 births
Living people
Sri Lankan female sprinters
Sri Lankan female long jumpers
Athletes (track and field) at the 2020 Summer Paralympics
Paralympic athletes of Sri Lanka